The figure skating competition at the 1998 Goodwill Games took place from July 29 to August 1, 1998 at Nassau Coliseum in Uniondale, USA. Medals were awarded in the disciplines of men's singles, ladies' singles, pair skating, and ice dancing.

Schedule
 July 29, 1998 - Men's short program, ice dance compulsory dance, pairs short program
 July 30, 1998 - Ice dance original dance, ladies' short program
 July 31, 1998 - Men's free skating, pair's free skating
 August 1, 1998 - Ladies' free skating, ice dance free dance

Results

Men

Ladies
On July 24, 1998 Nicole Bobek withdrew from the games.

Pairs

Ice dancing

References

External links
 Results
 1998 Goodwill Games

Goodwill Games
Goodwill Games
1998 Goodwill Games
1998